John Michael Kolen (born January 31, 1948) is a former American football linebacker who played eight seasons in the National Football League (NFL) for the Miami Dolphins. Because of his hard-hitting style, he was nicknamed "Captain Crunch."  He played for Berry High School in Hoover, Alabama, and collegiately for the Auburn Tigers.

NFL history
Kolen was involved in one of the most famous plays in NFL history. In the December 21, 1974 playoff game between the Dolphins and the Oakland Raiders is the so-called Sea of Hands game. With 35 seconds to play and the Dolphins leading 26-21, the Raiders had the ball 1st and Goal at the Miami 8-yard line. Quarterback Ken Stabler dropped back to pass and was flushed out of the pocket and nearly sacked by defensive end Vern Den Herder. As he went down, Stabler wristed a weak pass toward running back Clarence Davis in the end zone. Davis was surrounded by three Dolphins, including Kolen. Kolen got his hands on the ball and nearly knocked it away, but somehow Davis, amidst a "sea of hands," ended up with the ball and the touchdown, giving the Raiders the win and ending the Dolphins' dynasty.

Personal life
Kolen lives in Birmingham, Alabama with his wife Nancy. He has two children, Kelly and John, and five grandchildren. Mike owns Kolen Financial Team and works with his son. 
He recently released a book The Greatest Team: A Playbook for Champions.

References

1948 births
Living people
American football linebackers
Players of American football from Alabama
Miami Dolphins players
Auburn Tigers football players
Auburn Tigers football announcers
People from Opelika, Alabama
People from Hoover, Alabama